Mirco Lüdemann (born December 15, 1973) is a retired German professional ice hockey defenceman.

Career 
A product of SG Dynamo Weißwasser, Lüdemann spent some time with the Fort McMurray Oil Barons of the Alberta Junior Hockey League in the early 1990s, before signing with Kölner Haie in 1993, where he enjoyed a record-breaking career.

He played 1197 league games for Kölner Haie over the span of his 23-year career, winning the German championship title in 1995 and 2002, the 1999 Spengler Cup and the 2004 German Cup competition. Lüdemann brought an end to his pro career after the 2015-16 season, retiring as the all-time leader in games played in the Deutsche Eishockey Liga (DEL).

He won a total of 132 caps for the German national team and went to the 1994, 1998 and 2002 Olympics. He also competed at seven World Championships.

On September 25, 2016, Lüdemann was honoured with a testimonial match in the Lanxess Arena, the home ice of the Kölner Haie, featuring several of his former teammates and opponents. He also had his jersey number 12 retired by the Cologne side that night.

Lüdemann joined the Kölner Haie front office after his career was over.

Career statistics

Regular season and playoffs

International

References

External links

1973 births
Living people
Fort McMurray Oil Barons players
German ice hockey defencemen
Kölner Haie players
People from Weißwasser
Olympic ice hockey players of Germany
Ice hockey players at the 1994 Winter Olympics
Ice hockey players at the 1998 Winter Olympics
Ice hockey players at the 2002 Winter Olympics
German expatriate sportspeople in Canada
German expatriate ice hockey people
Sportspeople from Saxony